Anjalankoski Radio and TV-Mast is a mast in Kouvola, Finland.

See also
List of tallest structures in Finland

Notes

Towers completed in 1965
Communication towers in Finland
Transmitter sites in Finland
1965 establishments in Finland